Juventus F.C. finished the season as Serie A champions. They also won the European Cup Winners' Cup and participated in the Coppa Italia.

Squad

Competitions

Serie A

League table

Matches

Coppa Italia

Group 2

Round of 16

European Cup Winners' Cup

First round

Second round

Quarter-finals

Semi-finals

Final

References

Juventus F.C. seasons
Juventus
Italian football championship-winning seasons
UEFA Cup Winners' Cup-winning seasons